Bickram Ghosh is an Indian classical tabla player.

Early life
He started learning tabla from his father, Pandit Shankar Ghosh, who had played with Ali Akbar Khan.

Career
Ghosh has performed with Ali Akbar Khan and Pandit Ravi Shankar. 

Ghosh performs in various avatars. His long-standing band, Rhythmscape, which performs neo-fusion music, celebrated their 10th anniversary in 2011. To celebrate the occasion Rhythmscape collaborated with Greg Ellis to perform in Kolkata and Mumbai, an event organized by Folktronic. The band also released their second album, Transformation, which went on to win the Best Fusion Album at the Indian Recording Arts Awards 2012.
Ghosh performs within Troikala with Assamese folk/indie singer Papon and Scottish singer-songwriter Rachel Sermanni. Troikala was curated and organized by British Council in association with Folktronic. He performed as part of fusion Sufi act, "Sufusion" with vocalists Ambarish Das and Parvati Kumar, keyboardist Indrajit Dey, and drummer Arun Kumar.

Ghosh collaborated with Sonu Nigam to compose the music for the film Jal. Ghosh has also scored music for the Mira Nair production, Little Zizou.

Ghosh launched his music company, Melting Pot Productions, in October 2010.

Recent activities

On 1 October 2012, Ghosh won the 2012 Global Indian Music Academy (GIMA) Awards in the Best Pop/Rock Single category for his composition, Vande Mataram, featuring a host of artists across India, including Sonu Nigam, Shankar Mahadevan and Sunidhi Chauhan. 
In June 2012, Ghosh performed a concert "One World Fusion Extravaganza" at Shilpakala Vedika auditorium in Hyderabad to mark World Music Day. He appeared in an episode of MTV Roots.

Personal life
He married actress Jaya Seal in 2004.

Discography

New-age experimental

Collaborations

Classical solo

Classical accompaniment

Experimental accompaniment

Filmography
Actor :
 Hotath Neerar Jonnyo
 Choy
Music director (Bengali films) :

Music director (Hindi films) :

References

External links

 Official Website
 

1966 births
Living people
Tabla players
Indian male classical musicians
Indian percussionists
Bengali male actors
Bengali musicians
St. Xavier's College, Kolkata alumni
University of Calcutta alumni
Jadavpur University alumni
Indian film score composers
World music percussionists
Musicians from Kolkata
Indian male film score composers
Recipients of the Sangeet Natak Akademi Award